Matthew M. Roth (born October 14, 1982) is a former American football Defensive end in the National Football League (NFL). He was drafted by the Miami Dolphins in the second round of the 2005 NFL Draft. He played college football at Iowa. He also played for the Cleveland Browns and Jacksonville Jaguars.

Early years
Roth attended Willowbrook High School in Villa Park, Illinois. He was a consensus All-America pick as a senior when he played linebacker and fullback.

Roth lettered three times in wrestling (took his junior off to focus on football), where he won a state title as a senior with a record of 31-0.

College career
Roth was a two-time First-team All-Big Ten selection and an All-America selection as a senior at the University of Iowa.

Roth began his Iowa career as a middle linebacker. He shifted to the defensive line in 2002.

Professional career

Pre-draft

Miami Dolphins
Roth was drafted by the Miami Dolphins in the second round (46th overall) of the 2005 NFL Draft, using the pick acquired in the Patrick Surtain trade.

Roth played in a reserve role in all 32 games in his first two seasons.

With the departure of Kevin Carter to the Tampa Bay Buccaneers and David Bowens to free agency, Roth was named starting defensive end in 2007.

In 2008, Roth moved to outside linebacker after the Dolphins shifted to the 3-4 defense. He started 14 of 16 games.

Roth was the subject of controversy at the beginning of training camp in 2009. According to head coach Tony Sparano, Roth failed the team's initial conditioning test due to an unknown illness. Roth's agent, Drew Rosenhaus, stated in a television appearance the failed test was due to a groin injury. On September 5, Roth was placed on the Reserve/Non-Football-Injury list. He was later waived on November 24 of that year.

Cleveland Browns
Roth was claimed off waivers by the Cleveland Browns on November 25, 2009.

Jacksonville Jaguars
On August 11, 2011, Roth signed with the Jacksonville Jaguars.

NFL statistics

Key
 GP: games played
 COMB: combined tackles
 TOTAL: total tackles
 AST: assisted tackles
 SACK: sacks
 FF: forced fumbles
 FR: fumble recoveries
 FR YDS: fumble return yards 
 INT: interceptions
 IR YDS: interception return yards
 AVG IR: average interception return
 LNG: longest interception return
 TD: interceptions returned for touchdown
 PD: passes defensed

References

External links

Iowa Hawkeyes bio
Miami Dolphins bio

1982 births
Living people
Players of American football from Illinois
American football defensive ends
American football linebackers
Iowa Hawkeyes football players
Miami Dolphins players
Cleveland Browns players
Jacksonville Jaguars players
People from Villa Park, Illinois